Kurbjuweit is a surname. Notable people with the surname include:

  (born 1962), German journalist and author
 Lothar Kurbjuweit (born 1950), German football player
 Tobias Kurbjuweit (born 1982), German football player

Old-Prussian-language surnames